Jonathan D. "Jon" Gosier (born 1981 or 1982) is a software developer, investor, and philanthropist.  He was named as one of Ten African Tech Voices to Follow on Twitter by CNN  and one of the 25 most influential African-Americans in Technology by Business Insider. He was awarded a TED Fellowship in 2009 and later named a TED Senior Fellow. Jon is Knight News Challenge award winner for Abayima which makes crisis communications technology for disasters. In 2013 Gosier was nominated as one of three Innovators of the Year by Black Enterprise Magazine for his work with data startup MetaLayer.

Ushahidi 

From 2009 to 2011 Jon Gosier was the Director of SwiftRiver at Ushahidi.  Jon later went on to found big data startup MetaLayer.

Appfrica 

Jon is currently the founder and CEO of Appfrica. Appfrica (sometimes referred to as Appfrica Labs) is a technology firm founded by current CEO Jon Gosier in 2008 in Kampala, Uganda.  The firm has been responsible for a number of technology initiatives responsible for promoting Africa's technology sector including Apps4Africa, HiveColab, QuestionBox and for helping Google Africa translate its page for Ugandan audiences.

Apps4Africa 

Jon was one of the founders of Apps4Africa, an accelerator for African technology initiatives. Apps4Africa began with a series of Challenges whose sponsors include Appfrica and the U.S. Department of State.  The goal of Apps4Africa is to promote 'African solutions to African problems' by rewarding African technologists seeking to impact society with their inventions. The competition asks civil society and citizens throughout the continent to submit local community challenges on issues like transparency and better governance, health, education and more. The project began in late 2009 with a partnership formed between Appfrica and the U.S. Department of State, Bureau of African Affairs, Office of Public Diplomacy (AF/PDPA) as part of President Barack
Obama's administration's 21st Century Statecraft initiative.

Southbox Entertainment 
Jon Gosier founded Southbox Entertainment in 2017. In September 2019, Southbox Entertainment announced its launch in Atlanta, to serve as a source of capital for filmmakers and TV producers.

References

External links
 
 
 TED.com profile
 Appfrica
 Appfrica Blog
 Apps4Africa Blog
 Ushahidi
 MetaLayer

1980s births
Living people
American software engineers
American bloggers
African-American company founders
American company founders
21st-century African-American writers
20th-century African-American people